Rabbi Solomon ben Moses of Chelm (also known as Shlomo of Chelm or Shlomo Chelma) (1715/16–1781)  was a rabbinical scholar, best known for his multi-volume  Mirkeves Hamishneh, part of which was published posthumously. He participated in the 1742, 1751 and 1753 rulings of The Council of Four Lands.

Early life
He was "regarded as a prodigy" and had the benefits of his birth to "wealthy parents from well-known families" including that in 1742 "before he had turned 25" becoming the chief rabbi of Chelm and the surrounding area. During his early married years
he had been supported by his father-in-law, Moses Parnes.

According to the research of Rabbi Reuven Margolies he was a healer a Baal Shem and was known as Rebbi Adam Baal Shem. In the introduction to his sefer the leaders of the generation refer to him as Rebbi Adam.

Mirkevet HaMishneh
The first volume of the manuscript, which was only partially published in the author's lifetime, came out in 1751.

Other works
Another work was named Chug HaAretz, completed 1781. was not published until 1988. Two volumes of his ten volume overview of Shulchan Aruch were published in his lifetime.

Get of Cleves
For taking sides in the Get of Cleves, a controversy involving many of Eastern Europe's rabbis of that time, his secular knowledge, including knowing several non-Jewish languages, was turned against him, and the other side called him "a frequenter of concerts and chess-player [and] other choice epithets."

References

1781 deaths
People from Chełm
18th-century Polish rabbis